Sonchus canariensis, the tree sonchus, is a species of plant endemic to the Canary Islands.

Description 
Its leaves are arranged in a terminal rosette on the branches. The capitula are wide, up to 1.5 cm in diameter and 3 m in height, arranged in a loose inflorescence. The leaves are pinnatisect, with narrow foliar lobes.

Distribution 
Sonchus canariensis is endemic to the central Canary islands, with the subspecies canariensis on both islands and subspecies orotavensis Boulos only in Tenerife.

Etymology 
Sonchus: generic name from the Latin Sonchus, -i , derived from the Greek σόθχος, the locksmith; used by Pliny the Elder in its History Naturalis , 22, 88

canariensis: alluding to the Canary archipelago, in its broadest sense.

References

External links 
 A record of growing Sonchus canariensis

canariensis
Flora of Africa